In group theory, a subfield of abstract algebra, a group cycle graph illustrates the various cycles of a group and is particularly useful in visualizing the structure of small finite groups. 

A cycle is the set of powers of a given group element a, where an, the n-th power of an element a is defined as the product of a multiplied by itself n times. The element a is said to generate the cycle.  In a finite group, some non-zero power of a must be the  group identity, e; the lowest such power is the order of the cycle, the number of distinct elements in it. In a cycle graph, the cycle is represented as a polygon, with the vertices representing the group elements, and the connecting lines indicating that all elements in that polygon are members of the same cycle.

Cycles
Cycles can overlap, or they can have no element in common but the identity. The cycle graph displays each interesting cycle as a polygon.

If a generates a cycle of order 6 (or, more shortly, has order 6), then a6 = e. Then the set of  powers of a2, {a2, a4, e} is a cycle, but this is really no new information. Similarly, a5 generates the same cycle as a itself.

So, only the primitive cycles need be considered, namely those that are not subsets of another cycle. Each of these is generated by some primitive element, a.  Take one point for each element of the original group. For each primitive element, connect e to a, a to a2, ..., an−1 to an, etc., until e is reached. The result is the cycle graph.

When a2 = e, a has order 2 (is an involution), and is connected to e by two edges. Except when the intent is to emphasize the two edges of the cycle, it is typically drawn as a single line between the two elements.

Properties 

As an example of a group cycle graph, consider the dihedral group Dih4. The multiplication table for this group is shown on the left, and the cycle graph is shown on the right with e specifying the identity element.

Notice the cycle {e, a, a2, a3} in the multiplication table, with a4 = e. Similarly, any cycle in any group has at least two generators, and may be traversed in either direction. More generally, the number of generators of a cycle with n elements is given by the Euler φ function of n, and any of these generators may be written as the first node in the cycle (next to the identity e); or more commonly the nodes are left unmarked. Two distinct cycles cannot intersect in a generator.

Cycles that contain a non-prime number of elements have cyclic subgroups that are not shown in the graph. For the group  Dih4 above, we could draw a line between a2 and e since , but since a2 is part of a larger cycle, this is not an edge of the cycle graph.

There can be ambiguity when two cycles share a non-identity element. For example, the 8-element quaternion group has cycle graph shown at right. Each of the elements in the middle row when multiplied by itself gives −1 (where 1 is the identity element). In this case we may use different colors to keep track of the cycles, although symmetry considerations will work as well.

As noted earlier, the two edges of a 2-element cycle are typically represented as a single line.

The inverse of an element is the node symmetric to it in its cycle, with respect to the reflection which fixes the identity.

History 
Cycle graphs were investigated by the number theorist Daniel Shanks in the early 1950s as a tool to study multiplicative groups of residue classes. Shanks first published the idea in the 1962 first edition of his book Solved and Unsolved Problems in Number Theory. In the book, Shanks investigates which groups have isomorphic cycle graphs and when a cycle graph is planar. In the 1978 second edition, Shanks reflects on his research on class groups and the development of the baby-step giant-step method: 

Cycle graphs are used as a pedagogical tool in Nathan Carter's 2009 introductory textbook Visual Group Theory.

Graph characteristics of particular group families 

Certain group types give typical graphs:

Cyclic groups Zn, order n, is a single cycle graphed simply as an n-sided polygon with the elements at the vertices:

When n is a prime number, groups of the form (Zn)m will have  n-element cycles sharing the identity element:

Dihedral groups Dihn, order 2n consists of an n-element cycle and n 2-element cycles:

Dicyclic groups, Dicn = Q4n, order 4n:

Other direct products:

Symmetric groups – The symmetric group Sn contains, for any group of order n, a subgroup isomorphic to that group. Thus the cycle graph of every group of order n will be found in the cycle graph of Sn.
See example: Subgroups of S4

Example: Subgroups of the full octahedral group

The full octahedral group is the direct product  of the symmetric group S4 and the cyclic group Z2.
Its order is 48, and it has subgroups of every order that divides 48.

In the examples below nodes that are related to each other are placed next to each other,
so these are not the simplest possible cycle graphs for these groups (like those on the right).

Like all graphs a cycle graph can be represented in different ways to emphasize different properties. The two representations of the cycle graph of S4 are an example of that.

See also 

 List of small groups
 Cayley graph

External links

References

 Skiena, S. (1990). Cycles, Stars, and Wheels. Implementing Discrete Mathematics: Combinatorics and Graph Theory with Mathematica (pp. 144-147).
 
 Pemmaraju, S., & Skiena, S. (2003). Cycles, Stars, and Wheels. Computational Discrete Mathematics: Combinatorics and Graph Theory with Mathematica (pp. 248-249). Cambridge University Press.

Abstract algebra
Group theory
Application-specific graphs